The New Zealand Automobile Association (NZAA or AA) is an incorporated society (non-profit organization) that offers various services to its members. These services include free motoring advice, breakdown assistance, vehicle repairs, driver licensing, driver training, travel maps, accommodation guides and bookings, insurance, and finance. As of 2020, the AA has over 1.7 million members across New Zealand.

The organization has been advocating for the creation of a better and safer driving environment for New Zealanders since 1903, and is the oldest and largest motoring club in the country. The AA's commitment to safety is reflected in its range of services, which are designed to help motorists navigate the challenges of New Zealand's roads.

History
In May 1903, Dr George Thomas Humphrey de Clive-Lowe invited about 20 new motoring enthusiasts to consider his idea to start an automobile club. First in Auckland, followed by Canterbury a few months later, motoring clubs began to dot the country with at least 15 different automobile associations registered by 1930. During the 1980s, 15 district automobile associations began to merge to form the New Zealand Automobile Association and became the country's largest club. The final merger was achieved in 1991 under the leadership of the former Chief Executive, Brian Gibbons. Products and services diversified through new joint venture companies, franchise operations and business partnerships during the 1990s.

International affiliations

The AA is a member of the Fédération Internationale de l'Automobile (FIA) through which its members can receive reciprocal road services in a number of countries across the world.

Products and services
 AA Roadservice provides 24/7 national breakdown and roadside assistance. Callouts can be made through the AA's website, phone or through the AA Roadservice app. The AA attends nearly half a million requests every year.
 AA Battery Service is a mobile battery service that can replace batteries on the spot in most areas.
 AA Auto Glass can assess windscreen chip and crack damage on the spot in most parts of New Zealand. It provides temporary side window replacements, chip repair, and windscreen replacement services.
 Motoring Services has a range of products and services including AA Auto Centres and AA Auto Service & Repair sites, AA Licensed Repairers, AA Vehicle Testing stations and nationwide Vehicle Inspection services. Vehicle history and vehicle valuation reports are also offered. The AA also shares up-to-date car reviews, vehicle safety ratings and motoring advice. 
 AA Motoring Affairs works with the government, industry and media to represent the interests of motorists and its members. The AA is a voice of support for the mobility of members and the motoring public.
 AA Driver & Vehicle Licensing Agents enable members, motorists and customers throughout the country to access services such as membership joins and renewals, travel guides and maps, driver and vehicle licensing requirements, international driving permits, passport photos and Inland Revenue Department applications.  
 Driver Education and Driver Training  for both new learner drivers and also experienced motorists through a range of driving courses. The AA also has more than 100 driving instructors throughout the country.
 AA Traveller provides a wide range of travel services and free information available through AA Centres, agents and the website. Every year more than three million maps and accommodation guides are published. Reservations can be made through the website with special rates for members. Travel insurance is also available.
 AA Smartfuel is the AA's loyalty programme and enables motorists to earn fuel discounts by swiping their AA Membership card or an AA Smartfuel card at participating retailers, then redeeming the accumulated fuel discounts at any participating BP or Caltex service station in New Zealand.
 AA Insurance offers insurance options from car insurance to home and contents. AA members receive discounts on most insurance policies.
 AA Life Insurance offers a range of life insurance options including accidental death, term life and funeral cover. 
 AA Health Insurance offers A range of private medical insurance including Everyday, Private Hospital, Private Hospital and Specialists. 
 AA Pet Insurance offers comprehensive insurance for New Zealand Dogs and Cats. 
 AA Travel Insurance offers travel insurance when travelling through New Zealand or abroad with a selection of plans (Essentials, Comprehensive, Frequent Flyer and Business Cover). 
 AA Money provides financing for vehicle purchases including car, motorbike and boat loans, as well as leisure financing, business finance, savings and investment options.

References

External links 

AA website
AA Driving school

Financial services companies established in 1903
New Zealand
Transport organisations based in New Zealand
Emergency road services